Geltsdale RSPB reserve is a nature reserve in Geltsdale, Cumbria, England. The Royal Society for the Protection of Birds manages the site for upland birds such as the hen harrier and black grouse.

The reserve is within a Site of Special Scientific Interest (SSSI) called Geltsdale & Glendue Fells. Along with other SSSIs in the North Pennines, it is designated a Special Protection Area under the Birds Directive.
The reserve is managed within the context of a commercial hill farm.

Birdlife and habitats
The hen harrier is a bird of open habitats such as heather moorland, a type of vegetation which is typical of the reserve. Although such habitats are common in the uplands of England, the bird is scarce, being illegally persecuted as a predator of red grouse. In 2013, hen harriers failed to breed successfully in England for the first time in almost half a century.

The black grouse requires a more varied habitat than the hen harrier and the RSPB has planted many trees at Geltsdale.

Another bird of interest is the curlew, which since 2020 has been supported in this part of northern England by a project funded by the European Union's LIFE programme.
Howgill Beck, a stream which runs through the reserve, has "rewiggled" to attract wildlife such as waders.

Facilities
There is a visitor information point.

There is free entry to the reserve.
There are four waymarked trails leading from the car park at Howgill:
 There is a viewpoint at an altitude of 1,500 feet at Bruthwaite. The Bruthwaite trail is 1.8 miles, 
the Stagsike Trail covers 2.8 miles
 the Moorland Trails are 2.5 miles and 5 miles respectively.

Recent Hen harrier breeding attempts
In 2016 a hen harrier chick fledged at the reserve.
Named Bonny, he was one of only seven such chicks to fledge that year in England. Bonny was satellite tagged as part of a project funded by the European Union's LIFE Programme, "Conserving the hen harrier (Circus cyaneus) in northern England and southern and eastern Scotland" (LIFE13 NAT/UK/000258).
Information was no longer transmitted from the tag after 14 December 2016 and he is assumed to have died.

In 2021 four chicks fledged from a nest at Geltsdale. The adults had been supported by a feeding programme designed to reduce the distances they had to travel from the nest.

Notes
1. North Pennines AONB
2. Geltsdale & Glendue Fells

References

External links
 Official website

Moorlands of England
Nature reserves in Cumbria
Royal Society for the Protection of Birds reserves in England